John Edmonds (born 28 January 1944) is a British former trade union official.

Edmonds grew up in South London, and was educated at Christ's Hospital School and Oriel College, Oxford. On graduation, he found work as a research assistant with the National Union of General and Municipal Workers, moving on to become a field officer, then a National Industrial Officer.

In 1986, Edmonds became General Secretary of the union, by then known as the GMB. In this role, he became known as a critic of Tony Blair's leadership of the Labour Party. He stood down as leader in 2003, one year ahead of schedule. In retirement, he has remained active in the Labour Party in south London.

References

1944 births
Living people
Alumni of Oriel College, Oxford
People educated at Christ's Hospital
General Secretaries of the GMB (trade union)
Members of the General Council of the Trades Union Congress
Presidents of the Trades Union Congress
British republicans